The 1983 Yamaha International Masters was a non-ranking snooker tournament, that was held between 28 February to 6 March 1983 at the Assembly Rooms in Derby, England.
 


Main draw

Group 1

Group 2

Group 3

Group 4

Semi-final group 1

Semi-final group 2

Final

Qualifying

Group 1

Group 2

Group 3

Group 4

References

British Open (snooker)
British Open
British Open
British Open
British Open